Internet censorship in India is done by both central and state governments. DNS filtering and educating service users in suggested usages is an active strategy and government policy to regulate and block access to Internet content on a large scale. Also measures for removing content at the request of content creators through court orders have become more common in recent years. Initiating a mass surveillance government project like Golden Shield Project is also an alternative discussed over the years by government bodies.

Overview

OpenNet Initiative report
The OpenNet Initiative classified India as engaged in "selective" Internet filtering in the political, conflict/security, social, and Internet tools areas in 2011. ONI describes India as:

Reporters Without Borders "countries under surveillance"
In March 2012, Reporters Without Borders added India to its list of "countries under surveillance", stating that:

Freedom House report
Freedom House's Freedom on the Net 2017 report gives India a Freedom on the Net status of "Partly Free" with a rating of 41 (scale from 0 to 100, lower is better). Its Obstacles to Access was rated 12 (0–25 scale), Limits on Content was rated 9 (0–35 scale) and Violations of User Rights was rated 20 (0–40 scale). India was ranked 26th out of the 65 countries included in the report.

The Freedom on the Net 2012 report, says:
 India's overall Internet Freedom Status is "Partly Free", unchanged from 2009.
 India has a score of 39 on a scale from 0 (most free) to 100 (least free), which places India 20 out of the 47 countries worldwide that were included in the 2012 report. India ranked 14 out of 37 countries in the 2011 report.
 India ranks third out of the eleven countries in Asia included in the 2012 report.
 Prior to 2008, censorship of Internet content by the Indian government was relatively rare and sporadic.
 Following the November 2008 terrorist attacks in Mumbai, which killed 171 people, the Indian Parliament passed amendments to the Information Technology Act (ITA) that expanded the government's censorship and monitoring capabilities.
 While there is no sustained government policy or strategy to block access to Internet content on a large scale, measures for removing certain content from the web, sometimes for fear they could incite violence, have become more common.
 Pressure on private companies to remove information that is perceived to endanger public order or national security has increased since late 2009, with the implementation of the amended ITA. Companies are required to have designated employees to receive government blocking requests, and assigns up to seven years' imprisonment to private service providers—including ISPs, search engines, and cybercafes—that do not comply with the government's blocking requests.
 Internet users have sporadically faced prosecution for online postings, and private companies hosting the content are obliged by law to hand over user information to the authorities.
 In 2009, the Supreme Court ruled that bloggers and moderators can face libel suits and even criminal prosecution for comments posted on their websites.
 Prior judicial approval for communications interception is not required and both central and state governments have the power to issue directives on interception, monitoring, and decryption. All licensed ISPs are obliged by law to sign an agreement that allows Indian government authorities to access user data.

Background
In June 2000, the Indian Parliament created the Information Technology (IT) Act to provide a legal framework to regulate Internet use and commerce, including digital signatures, security, and hacking. The act criminalises the publishing of obscene information electronically and grants police powers to search any premises without a warrant and arrest individuals in violation of the act. A 2008 amendment to the IT Act reinforced the government's power to block Internet sites and content and criminalised sending messages deemed inflammatory or offensive.

Internet filtering can also be mandated through licensing requirements. For example, ISPs seeking licences to provide Internet services with the Department of Telecommunications (DOT) "shall block Internet sites and/or individual subscribers, as identified and directed by the Telecom Authority from time to time" in the interests of "national security". Licence agreements also require ISPs to prevent the transmission of obscene or otherwise objectionable material.

In 2001, the Bombay High Court appointed a committee to oversee issues relating to online pornography and Cybercrime. The Court invited the petitioners, Jayesh Thakkar and Sunil Thacker, to make recommendations on cyber laws. The committee published a report which analyses the key issues and made recommendations regarding areas such as the licensing of cyber cafés, putative identity cards for cyber cafe visitors, that minors use computers in public spaces, and the maintenance of IP logs by cyber cafes. The committee also recommended that internet service providers keep correct time logs and records.

The report also addressed the protection of children from adult websites and advised internet service providers to provide parental control software for every Internet connection. The committee also identified lack of technical knowledge in the police as a problem. The report was well received by the courts, and its recommendations are being implemented the police and cyber cafés. The Cyber Crime Investigation Cell was set up pursuant to a recommendation made by the committee.

In 2003, the Government of India established the Indian Computer Emergency Response Team (CERT-IN) to ensure Internet security. Its stated mission is "to enhance the security of India's Communications and Information Infrastructure through proactive action and effective collaboration". CERT-IN is the agency that accepts and reviews requests to block access to specific websites. All licensed Indian ISPs must comply with CERT-IN decisions. There is no review or appeals process. Many institutions, including the Ministry of Home Affairs, courts, the intelligence services, the police and the National Human Rights Commission, may call on it for specialist expertise. By stretching the prohibition against publishing obscene content to include the filtering of Web sites, CERT-IN was empowered to review complaints and act as the sole authority for issuing blocking instructions to the Department of Telecommunications (DOT). Many have argued that giving CERT-IN this power through executive order violates constitutional jurisprudence holding that specific legislation must be passed before the government can encroach on individual rights.

"I am mystified by our government's approach both to the internet and to the millions of Indians using it. It does not adhere to the values of our republic and democracy. This matter needs to be addressed urgently, for which I propose to file a PIL in the Supreme Court. Don't kill the freedom of speech, change the IT Rules", says Rajeev Chandrasekhar, Member of Parliament.

Timeline of censorship

Dawn website (1999)
Immediately after the Kargil War in 1999, the website of the Pakistani daily newspaper Dawn was temporarily blocked from access within India by Videsh Sanchar Nigam Limited, a government-owned telecommunications company which at the time had monopoly control of the international internet gateways in India. Rediff, a media news website, claimed that the ban was instigated by the Indian government, and then published detailed instructions as to how one could bypass the filter and view the site.

Yahoo Groups (2003)
In September 2003, Kynhun, a Yahoo group linked to the "Hynniewtrep National Liberation Council" (an illegal, minor separatist group from Meghalaya), which discussed the case of the Khasi tribe was banned. The Department of Telecommunications asked Indian ISPs to block the group, but difficulties led to all Yahoo! groups being banned for approximately two weeks.

Websites blocked (2006)
In July 2006, the Indian government ordered the blocking of 17 websites, including some hosted on the Geocities, Blogspot and Typepad domains. Initial implementation difficulties led to these domains being blocked entirely. Access to sites on these domains other than those specifically banned was restored by most ISPs after about a week.

Orkut and Indian law enforcement agreement (2007)
In 2007, Indian law enforcement entered an agreement with the then popular social networking site Orkut to track down what it deems defamatory content which, in their example, includes content critical of Bal Thackeray.

2011

New IT rules adopted 
The "IT Rules 2011" were adopted in April 2011 as a supplement to the 2000 Information Technology Act (ITA). The new rules require Internet companies to remove within 36 hours of being notified by the authorities any content that is deemed objectionable, particularly if its nature is "defamatory," "hateful", "harmful to minors", or "infringes copyright". Cybercafé owners are required to photograph their customers, follow instructions on how their cafés should be set up so that all computer screens are in plain sight, keep copies of client IDs and their browsing histories for one year, and forward this data to the government each month.

Websites banned 
In March 2011, the Government banned several websites, Typepad, Mobango, Clickatell, and Facebook for some time without warning.

On 21 July 2011, all file hosting websites were blocked by ISPs to prevent copyright infringement of the film Singham, causing anger amongst Internet users. This ban was later lifted.

On 24 December 2011, Reliance Communications, a widely used ISP, again blocked access to file-sharing sites, having obtained a John Doe order from a Delhi court to help protect the movie Don 2 several days before its release. The block was lifted on 30 December 2011.

Pre-screening of Internet content 
On 5 December 2011, The New York Times India Ink reported that the Indian government had asked several social media sites and internet companies, including Google, Facebook and Yahoo!, to "prescreen user content from India and to remove disparaging, inflammatory or defamatory content before it goes online". Top officials from the Indian units of Google, Microsoft, Yahoo and Facebook had several meetings with Kapil Sibal, India's acting telecommunications minister to discuss the issue in recent months, India Ink reported. In one meeting, Sibal asked these companies "to use human beings to screen content, not technology", the article said.

On 6 December 2011, communications minister of India Kapil Sibal held a press conference confirming the India Ink story. "We have to take care of the sensibilities of our people," Mr. Sibal told more than 100 reporters during a press conference on the lawn at his home in New Delhi. "Cultural ethos is very important to us."

On 7 December 2011, The Times of India revealed that the search engine Google was asked to remove around 358 items by the Government of India out of which 255 items were said to criticise the government as per a Google transparency report. The government had asked Google to remove 236 items from Orkut and 19 items from YouTube for the same reason, it added. Other reasons include defamation (39 requests), privacy and security (20 requests), impersonation (14 requests), hate speech (8 requests), pornography (3 requests) and national security (1 request). Google admitted that 51 per cent of the total requests were partially or fully complied with. The news of banning and blocking objectionable content on the internet was seen negatively by many Indian netizens and #IdiotKapilSibal trended on Twitter after netizens expressed the outrage over the move. It was seen as a way to block websites criticising the government. In an interview to NDTV, Kapil Sibal responded by saying that most of the content being asked to be removed was pornographic in nature and involved deities, which could have caused communal disharmony. While Kapil Sibal claimed that the government wanted to remove pornographic content, Google transparency report published by Google claims that the content that included protests against social leaders or used offensive language in reference to religious leaders were not removed. Google on its transparency report states

Google on this matter has also said that

While presently there are talks going on between the government and officials of internet companies like Google and Facebook, there is no consensus on this issue.

Ban on Cartoons Against Corruption
In 2011, a nationwide anti corruption movement India Against Corruption gathered pace in the leadership of a veteran Gandhian Anna Hazare demanding Jan Lokpal Bill. Political cartoonist Aseem Trivedi joined the crusade and started a cartoon based campaign, Cartoons Against Corruption to support the movement with his art. He launched a website www.cartoonsagainstcorruption.com consisting of his sharp anti-corruption cartoons targeting corrupt system and the politicos. He displayed his cartoons in the MMRDA ground, Mumbai during the hunger strike of Anna Hazare.

Aseem Trivedi was exhibiting his political cartoons from Cartoons Against Corruption in the anti-corruption protest at the MMRDA grounds, when his website was suspended by Crime Branch, Mumbai. It was only 27 December, the first day of the protest, when he received an email from BigRock, the domain name registrar with which his website was registered, saying, "We have received a complaint from Crime Branch, Mumbai against domain name 'cartoonsagainstcorruption.com' for displaying objectionable pictures and texts related to flag and emblem of India. Hence we have suspended the domain name and its associated services."

The site was suspended after a complaint to the Mumbai Crime Branch by a Mumbai-based advocate and congress leader, R.P. Pandey. The complaint stated that "defamatory and derogatory cartoons" were displayed as posters during Mr. Hazare's hunger strike in Mumbai. Noting that the posters were created by Aseem Trivedi and "are believed to be made at the instance of Shri Anna Hazare", the complaint requested "strict legal action in the matter".

Following his website's ban, Aseem Trivedi uploaded all the cartoons to a blog he quickly created.

2012

Delhi court summons 

In January 2012, a Delhi court issued summonses to Google and Facebook headquarters for objectionable content. This was followed by the Delhi High Court saying that websites such as Google and Facebook were liable for the content, posted on their platform by users, as they benefited from the content. Google responded to both the Court and the Minister for Communication and IT Kapil Sibal, stating that it was impossible to pre-screen content. A plea was made by an educationist citing any sanctions against the online services will directly affect the fundamental right and will be against public interest. The Delhi Court also allowed Yahoo's case to be heard separately after it appealed citing it did not host any objectionable content and does not fall under the social networking site category.

Websites blocked 
Starting 3 May 2012, a number of websites including Vimeo, The Pirate Bay, Torrentz and other torrent sites were allegedly blocked by Reliance Communications, on orders from Department of Telecom without any stated reasons or prior warnings.

Reliance DNS servers compromised 
In May 2012, Anonymous India (AnonOpsIndia), a branch of the hacktivist group Anonymous, hacked the servers of Reliance Communications to protest the blocking of Vimeo, The Pirate Bay, Torrentz and other torrent sites. The ISP Reliance Communications stated that it simply followed a court order. The group also hacked Reliance DNS servers preventing direct access to Twitter, Facebook and many other websites in India on 26 May 2012 for allegedly blocking its Twitter handle @OpIndia_Revenge. They went on to warn the Government to restore all the blocked websites till 9 June 2012, and has planned a nationwide protests on the same date. After this hack, Anonymous also released a list of websites that had been blocked by Reliance without any orders from the government, raising questions of private and unaccountable censorship by telecom providers.

Annulment motion in Parliament against 2011 IT rules 
An annulment motion against the Information Technology (Inter-mediaries Guidelines) Rules, 2011 moved by Member of Parliament (MP) P. Rajeev of the Communist Party of India (Marxist) in the Rajya Sabha, was the first serious attempt by internet freedom activists to get the Information Technology Act, 2000 discussed and reviewed by the country's lawmakers. Not unexpectedly, the motion (specifically against the rules governing intermediaries – clause (zg) of subsection (2) of Section 87 read with subsection (2) of Section 79 of the IT Act, 2000) was not carried. However, the discussion that preceded it at least demonstrated the concerns of parliamentarians about what internet freedom activists have termed the "draconian" provisions of the IT Act.

Save Your Voice campaign 

Save Your Voice is a movement against Internet censorship in India. It was founded by cartoonist Aseem Trivedi and journalist Alok Dixit in January 2012. The movement opposes the Information Technology Act of India and demands democratic rules for the governance of Internet. The campaign is targeted at the draconian rules framed under the Information Technology Act, 2000.

Madras High Court: Entire websites cannot be blocked 

On 15 June 2012, the Madras High Court has passed an order saying that entire websites cannot be blocked on the basis of "John Doe" orders. The High Court order reads:

The High court provided this clarification after being approached by a consortium of Internet Service Providers. The order has been welcomed by the Indian media and net users.

Domain hosting sites 
Starting in July 2012 several domain hosting sites were banned. When opening these sites, a message saying that these sites have been blocked by the Department of Telecommunications or court order is displayed. Sites such as Buydomains.com, Fabulous.com, and Sedo.co.uk were blocked.

Censorship following Assam violence 

Between 18 and 21 August 2012 the Government of India ordered more than 300 specific URLs blocked. The blocked articles, accounts, groups, and videos were said to contain inflammatory content with fictitious details relating to Assam violence and supposedly promoting the North East exodus. These specific URLs include the domains of Facebook, Twitter, YouTube, BlogSpot, WordPress, Google Plus, Wikipedia, Times of India, and other websites. Many of the blocked URLs are Indian right wing activism against corruption.

This raised questions about freedom of speech in the largest democracy in the world. It also raised questions about the censorship of people and posts debunking rumors. The Economic Times called it levels of censorship "that have not so far been seen in India". Over four days from 18 August, the Government of India issued directives to Internet Service Providers to block the Twitter accounts of two Delhi-based journalists – Kanchan Gupta and Shiv Aroor – and Pravin Togadia. The government also blocked the website of Rashtriya Swayamsevak Sangh and several other right-wing websites. In addition, articles from Wikipedia, and news reports of violence in Assam on the websites of The Times of India, Firstpost, The Daily Telegraph and Al-jazeera were blocked. A petition was created to oppose Internet censorship in India by the Indian diaspora in the US.

Telecom Minister's website defaced 
In November 2012, Anonymous India defaced Indian Telecom Minister Kapil Sibal's constituency website in protest against an amendment to the Information Technology Act and the recent crackdown on netizens for comments posted online.

BSNL website defaced 
Bharat Sanchar Nigam Limited's (BSNL) website, www.bsnl.co.in, was hacked by Anonymous India on 13 December 2012. They defaced the website with a picture stating that they protest against section 66A of the IT Act and in support of cartoonist Aseem Trivedi and Alok Dixit. The duo have gone on a hunger striker to protest against Section 66A.

2013

39 websites blocked
In an order dated 13 June 2013, the Department of Telecommunications (DoT) directed Indian Internet service providers (ISPs) to block 39 websites. The order did not specify a reason or law under which the websites were blocked. Most are web forums, where Internet users share images and URLs to pornographic files. However, some of the websites are also image and file hosts, mostly used to store and share files that are not pornographic. While watching or distributing child pornography is illegal in India, watching adult pornography is not. The blocked websites are hosted outside India and claim to operate under the U.S. rule that requires performers to be over 18 years of age.

2014

File sharing and file hosting sites banned
In an order dated 23 June 2014, the Delhi High Court upon a request made by Sony Entertainment ordered 472 file sharing and file hosting websites blocked, including The Pirate Bay, Google Docs, Google Videos, and Google's URL shorterner (goo.gl). This is contrary to the 2012 Madras High Court orders which blocked only URLs referencing web pages with illegal content, rather than entire websites. However, it was reported on 7 July 2014 that an updated court order blocks just 219 sites. Included are many file storage and torrent websites, but no Google sites.

Whistle blower Savukku's site blocked by Judge C T Selvam
In an interim order on the petition filed by news reader Mahalaxmi, Justice Cyril Selvam blocked the entire website www.savukku.net. This order on 28 February 2014 directly contradicts an earlier order by Madras High Court on 15 April 2012 against banning entire website instead of specific URLs.

Earlier in Feb, savukku.net had exposed the tapes of conversations between DMK MP Kanimozhi and former Additional Director General of Police (ADGP) Jaffer Sait, Jaffer Sait and Kalaignar TV's former director Sharad Kumar, and DMK President M Karunanidhi's Secretary K.Shanmuganathan and Jaffer Sait.

Judge C T Selvam is considered to be close to Karunanidhi's family.

The Department of Telecommunications ordered blocking of 32 websites including the Internet Archive, GitHub, Dailymotion and Vimeo, as they could host terror content relating to ISIS but the sites are no longer blocked as of 1 January 2015 as the order had been reversed and the unblocking process has begun on compliant websites.

2015
Porn ban
On 1 August 2015, 857 pornographic sites were blocked under section 79 3(b) of Information Technology Act, 2000, to restrict access to pornographic content. This list was given to government officials by petitioner Kamlesh Vaswani on 17 October 2014 in Supreme Court of India. The original list was generated by Suresh Kumar Shukla, founder of Filternet Foundation which makes pornography-blocking software and contained popular sites. The block was ordered by the government Department of Telecom on 31 July 2015. A copy of the order is available through media websites.

The ban was lifted on 5 August the same year, by Department of Telecommunications. Porn is major internet traffic (as high as 70%) and telecom companies were losing revenue. Additionally people criticised the law enforcement (section 67 of IT Act 2000).

2016
In August 2016, some Bollywood studios came up with a public education message that black money generated from pre-release of their content through offline markets are sourced for terrorism, though sources were not clear. Reports show that piracy losses are significantly high.

In September 2016, the Ministry of Health and Family Welfare told a court that Google, Microsoft, and Yahoo! had agreed to censor all information on their search engines related to prenatal sex discernment in order to comply with the Pre-Conception and Pre-Natal Diagnostic Techniques Act, 1994.

2017
In August 2017, the Madras High Court ordered that the Internet Archive be blocked in India, following complaints by film studios who alleged that the service had been used to disseminate copyright-infringing copies of its films.

2018

Reinstating porn ban
In October 2018, the government directed Internet service providers to block 827 websites that host pornographic content following an order by the Uttarakhand High Court, effectively reinstating the previously rescinded 2015 porn ban. While the Uttarakhand High Court had asked to block 857 websites, the Ministry of Electronics and IT (Meity) also removed from 30 portals without any pornographic content listings. The court asked the Department of Telecom (DoT) to ban pornographic websites in India, citing an incident from Dehradun where a 10th standard girl was raped by four of her seniors. The accused later told Police that they did so after watching pornographic content on the web. As per, directions of Uttarakhand High Court and Regulations of DoT, Internet Service Providers of India banned pornographic websites across the country.

2019
Between January to October the Ministry of Electronics and Information Technology (Meity) revealed that the ministry issued the blocking orders for 20 websites in a response to an RTI query filed by SFLC India a Delhi-based not-for-profit legal services organisation.

During the same period, the ministry ordered social media platforms to take down 3433 URLs, under Section 69A of India's Information Technology Act to block users and posts across Social Media Platforms. An Indian court ordered Facebook, Twitter, and Google to remove government flagged content globally, not just in India.

In February, Indian government had proposed giving itself new powers, under the new proposed rules, Indian officials could demand Facebook, Google, Twitter, TikTok, WhatsApp and others to remove posts or videos that the officials deem unlawful or invasion of privacy and could trace a message to their original senders.

Over 130 complaints around the country from users appeared about blocked access to VPN, proxy sites. There were also reports of platforms like Telegram, Reddit and SoundCloud being inaccessible. There was no official word by the DoT for why were these platforms blocked, a common practice of the DoT which has a record of being non-transparent about the blockings.

2020 
In June 2020, in retaliation for a military clash between Indian and Chinese troops in a disputed territory along their shared border between Ladakh and western China, the Indian government banned around 60 mobile apps published by Chinese companies. This most notably included TikTok, WeChat, and mobile games such as PUBG Mobile. The stated reason for the bans were to protect the sovereignty, integrity, and security of India, and protect its citizens from software that was "stealing and surreptitiously transmitting users’ data in an unauthorised manner to servers outside India". The New York Times said that the ban was an example of how censorship and politics were fracturing the global internet The Indian Express said while many Indian TikTok stars may feel lost with the ban, the loss of revenue may motivate them to push for a shift to rival platforms and the Times of India in an editorial praised the block on TikTok.

Around 40 websites operated by the pro-Khalistan outfit Sikh For Justice (SFJ) were blocked in response to SFJ starting registrations on its websites for Referendum 2020. India does not recognize "Right to Self Determination". There were several reports of the search engine DuckDuckGo being inaccessible for the Indian users.

In July, environmental groups leading the movement against the Indian Government's new Environmental Impact Assessment (EIA) 2020 Draft reported that their websites were inaccessible to users in India. Fridays for Future India, and several other environmental collectives reported that their websites were blocked/taken down, for reasons unknown to them, without any prior notice of any sorts.

During the curfew in Jammu and Kashmir after revocation of its autonomous status on 5 August 2019, the Indian government approached Twitter to block accounts which were spreading anti-India content.

2021

Twitter during farmers' protests 
In early February, Twitter refused to comply with orders from the Indian government to ban over a thousand accounts related to farmers' protests. The government threatened Twitter employees with up to seven years of jail if the company fails to remove certain accounts that the government alleged to be spreading misinformation.

Subsequently, on 10 February 2021 the company took action on more than 500 accounts and also reduced the visibility of several hashtags that violated Twitter's rules. Twitter also said that accounts belonging to news media outlets, journalists, activists or politicians were not taken down.

Later, at the end of the month, the government issued new rules aimed at social media companies to comply with local laws. Under these rules, the social media companies are required to publish a compliance report every month detailing the complaints and the actions they took on them.

Government's handling of COVID-19 pandemic 
In late April, citizens were angry with the government's poor performance in handling the COVID-19 pandemic and took it to social media to express their dissatisfaction. The government has made an emergency order to Twitter to take down tweets from high-profile users that criticised its handling of the pandemic. Twitter has complied and withheld these tweets for users in India.

Twitter labelling BJP politicians' tweets 
In May, Twitter labelled tweets as "manipulated media" from several BJP politicians including Sambit Patra, its spokesperson. In the tweet, he claimed that Congress was using a "toolkit" to derail the government's efforts of handling the pandemic. However, fact-checking has debunked the claim. The government has expressed strong objections over the labels saying Twitter acted prejudicially and asked the company to remove the labels in the interest of "fairness and equity."

Subsequently, Delhi Police has visited Twitter's Delhi and Gurgaon offices to seek more information. After an hour, the police has vacated the premises as the offices were closed and no employees were present to engage with. In a statement, the Delhi Police has disputed calling the search event as "raiding." Reportedly, the police did not hold a search warrant.

Twitter expressed concerns for its employees, intimidation tactics by the police and potential threat to freedom of expression in India. It also said it was particularly concerned over the rule where the compliance officer, to be set up by social media companies with over five million users under new social media rules, is criminally liable for the content on the platform. It has requested the government a three-month extension to enforce the new requirements. In a RTI reply to the Internet Freedom Foundation the Ministry of Electronics and IT said it did not have powers to direct Twitter to not label these tweets as misleading.

2022
In 2022, under national security grounds, new regulations were implemented by CERT-In to require the retention of customer data by VPN, web hosting, and cloud service providers for five years. Some VPN providers, such as ExpressVPN and Surfshark, announced that they would no longer use servers under Indian jurisdiction in order to preserve the privacy of their customers.

Blocked websites
The process of blocking websites in India is quite non-transparent and the government does not maintain a public list of all the websites that have been blocked.
Over the years, the government has banned thousands of websites and URLs in the country with the help of internet service providers or under the directive of the courts. For example, in August 2015, the government banned at least 857 sites for their pornographic contents and in June 2016, the government further banned over 200 URLs for providing 'Escort Services'.

In August 2015, the Central government of India ordered TRAI and internet service providers based in India to ban domestic and international porn websites. In response, nearly 857 websites were blocked. Star India Pvt. Ltd., an entertainment company owned by 21st Century Fox have successfully gained authorization through hoodwinking the court. They can now force ISPs to block entire websites to tackle Internet piracy and sharing for their copyrighted content. This was gained through falsifying data that these sites are uploading videos when it is a user centered activity and covering up the fact each of these websites have active departments to regulate any sorts of infringement and misuse of their services. Prathiba M Singh, who had represented Star India, cited poor resources of media giants like Star India, for targeting these domains without block expiry period and their legal team termed these sites as "rogue sites" and expressed delight in their successive filing from 2014 and incognito win to violate freedom of trade on the Internet at least in India. Though some critics say this would be lifted eventually by seeing the fallacy as in similar previous cases. Many has raised there voice through social media that the proceedings being overly suspicious and was gained for an alternate means, which is aimed for profiting rather than the initial spike of alleged piracy of these copyrighted contents and strengthening an ongoing practice of bottle-necking the internet users to forced payment and culture of on-demand online access to content. This has happened in the same week were media personnel's filter-free over indulgences to manipulate ongoing cases and political statements without any guidelines were appalled by Lawyers in the country.

In 2016, India also put forwarded a new plan to control internet usage of its netizens. Until now, URLs and websites were blocked using DNS-filtering. This means the DNS of the blocked site was added to a list maintained by the internet service provider and whenever a user tried connecting to that site, the DNS server of the service provider would block that request. Officials suspect netizens are circumventing these measures knowingly or unknowingly. The government also intends to provide broad educational information classes, provide free operating systems with utilities for malware, free access to internet, and for computerized activities of daily life as a primary method. Currently, the government is joining hands with media content providers and internet service providers like big companies Tata Communications and Airtel to manage a number of internet gateways in India. Though many legal, technical and social action groups consider this as a threatening approach. Many social action groups say that these as inappropriate time and money spend while real issues like unemployment, access to education, freedom of practicing religion, women and children safety, drug use are ever rising. Lawyers with technical background say this might be warning message and DNS filtering is a better practice for enforcing Anti-piracy laws in current India. Some of them are also wary about how will these actions get reflected in terms hostility towards human rights, implications of these fines, profiteering stakeholders agendas, is it the government's first step to a long-term plan "monitoring the whole world wide web" as China does. Many of these services are malvertising, click away access and pops ups, how does the government intend to tackle these issues and problems with the current plan that is heavily in favor of corporation's margin and doesn't cater to its users needs. Other groups express their fear and uneasiness whether these will lead to emergency era like arrests where anything that government bodies believe is an "offence under the laws of India, including but not limited to under Sections 63, 63-A, 65 and 65-A of the Copyright Act, 1957".

Warning that allegedly created for TATA and Airtel users with threats implied beyond normal DoT remainder and block message shows as:

Current situation that have led to this sudden moves is reported to be by influence of film studios in India and courts who have regularly issued orders in the favor for them. Often these are done with the contracted lawyers of film studios approach courts in regular intervals ahead and after a movie's release seeking preventive blocks on the URLs they compile and list. This lists in reality are unprofessionally and "poorly compiled and often block is sought on full websites just on the basis of whims and fancies". "Once this order are issued, the copies of the order along with the list of URLs to be blocked go to DoT, which then they pass an order to internet service providers to block these sites". Once a URL is blocked it remains blocked, even years after the release of the film without an expiry. Patent lawyers also suggest to make practical changes in its laws according to the current e-environment like making materials accessible within six months to one year and protecting the content from manipulation and creative infringement of the same under copyright laws to lessen the current piracy problems.

In a response to an RTI application by SFLC India, the Ministry of Electronics and Information Technology stated that 14221 websites/URLs were blocked between 2010 and 2018. In 2011, journalist Tanul Thakur created the Dowry Calculator, a satirical website on the dowry system. In 2018, the website was blocked by the Government of India, which was challenged by Mr. Thakur with legal assistance by the Internet Freedom Foundation (IFF) in November 2019 before the Delhi High Court, as illegal and unconstitutional. The case came up for hearing on 21 March 2022, and the Court recorded Mr. Thakur’s submissions that he was not given an opportunity to be heard before the website was blocked. It has directed the Union of India to provide the entire case record, and asked the Union of India to consider giving Mr. Thakur a post-decisional hearing, including an opportunity to take corrective measures, if necessary.

In February 2022, the website of VideoLAN, the developers of the free and open-source media player software VLC Media Player, was blocked by most Indian ISPs. It was reported that the block may have been related to a cyberattack by a Chinese group, which had been using compromised versions of VLC as a payload for malicious software. In October 2022, VideoLAN, with assistance from the IFF, filed a legal notice seeking information on the block, which they accused of breaching the site blocking rules by not providing notice or an opportunity for a hearing. While information on the block was not published, the block was lifted in November 2022.

Internet shutdowns
India leads the world, in the list of Internet Shutdowns. In 2018, as reported by Access Now, out of 196 documented Internet Shutdowns globally, India accounted for 134 of them. The reasons for the shutdowns range from protests and political unrest to elections and exams. Internet Shutdowns have often helped the government to throttle dissent and mass-public gatherings. Aside from the socio-political impact, ICRIER estimates that between 2012 and 2017, 16,315 hours of Internet shutdown in India cost the economy approximately $3.04 billion. It was estimated that internet shutdowns caused US$2.8 billion of damage to India's economy in 2020, causing harm to businesses, teaching and healthcare. Between 2012 and 2017, the economic damage was estimated at US$3 billion. In 2021, India recorded total 317.5 hours of internet shutdown and 840 hours of Bandwidth throttling costing $582.8 million.

List of banned phone apps

This is a list of notable applications that have been banned in India pursuant to section 69-A of the Information Technology (Procedure and Safeguards for Blocking of Access of Information by Public) Rules, 2009.
On  2 September 2020 Indian government release another list of 118 apps.

Locations

Jammu and Kashmir
Before revocation of autonomous status of Jammu and Kashmir, the Internet services were shut down as part of curfew and complete communications blackout including cable TV, landlines and cellphones on 4 August 2019. The Internet was restored on 25 January 2020, when the government allowed people of Kashmir to access the internet on 2G with whitelisted websites. It was over a year later in February 2021 when access to high speed internet was restored across Jammu and Kashmir. This blockade and other frequent internet shutdowns in the region have been termed by a local human rights group as amounting to digital apartheid. Many students got affected because they could not study properly on online classes during lockdown because the internet speed was too slow. Broadband services were set to be restored the same day, but because of technical error BSNL could not restore it till 5 March 2020. Broadband was restored with full access whereas mobile internet at 2G. The State government shut down the Internet on 17–18 March 2014 in Jammu and Kashmir to stop separatists from addressing a United Nations Human Rights Council sideline event via video link in Geneva. Internet access was shut down again for mobile and landline broadband in July 2016 against the backdrop of protests.

The state government of Jammu and Kashmir on 26 April 2017 ordered the various Internet service providers (ISPs) operating in the valley to block access to 22 social networking websites for one month saying among other things, "endangering public life and property and causing unrest/ disharmony in the state". Pertinently, the order was passed by exercising the powers conferred under the Indian Telegraph Act, 1885 which technically became obsolete circa 2008 when the Government of India decided to stop all telegraph services in the country. As a result of this censorship, people living in the valley have resorted to circumvention tactics in the form of using web proxies, VPNs among other things. The popularity of these tactics have compelled the government to block access to Android Play Store among other services for some time in a bid to prevent citizens from getting access to these services.

The banned services include widely used services like Facebook, Twitter, WhatsApp but also surprisingly the list includes websites like QQ, Baidu, Qzone, which are not used outside of mainland China. Xanga, a website featured in the list, shut down in 2013. These websites mostly being in Mandarin has people concerned that the censorship has been an attempt to suppress dissent only by all means necessary, as opposed to their claim of "maintaining peace and harmony".

Rajasthan 
Internet was suspended in 4 districts of Rajasthan in October 2021, following violent protests.

Internet was suspended across Rajasthan in view of the Rajasthan Administrative services exam, in October 2021.

Internet servies across Rajasthan were suspended to prevent cheating in the teachers recruitment exam, in September 2021.

Internet services were blocked in the state for days amid religious tensions in the aftermath of the murder of Kanhaiya Lal, this was done to stop the spread of the beheading video.

Gujarat
The State Government of Gujarat shut down the Internet in Vadodara, Gujarat from 27 September 2014 for 3 days due to communal clashes between two communities, even though only the central government has the power to shut down the Internet under the Information Technology Act, 2000 and that, in addition, under a declared state of emergency under Article 352 of the Constitution of India when freedom of speech and expression is suspended. No formal announcement was made regarding this by the city police or the Internet service providers.

When the Patidar reservation agitation turned violent on 25 August 2015, the internet services on mobile phones and broadband were restricted as certain social media platforms like WhatsApp and Facebook were blocked for six days from 26 August 2015 to 31 August 2015 across the state.

Nagaland
The State Government of Nagaland shut down the Internet for the entire state, from 7 March 2015 for 48 hours due to the mob lynching of a man.

Both SMS and internet/data services were suspended in Nagaland from 30 January 2017, which were restored on 20 February 2017 after being blocked for 20 days. The block was initiated to prevent the spread of violence in the state. This situation came up when two Naga tribal bodies had served a three-day ultimatum to Zeliang to step down following the government's decision to hold local body elections with 33% reservation for women in 12 towns across the state and the death of two persons in clashes between the police and protestors at Dimapur, the commercial hub of Nagaland, on the night of 31 January 2017.

Manipur
The State Government of Manipur shut down the Internet of some service providers, who provide Internet through mobile technology 2G/3G/4G in Manipur from 1 September 2015 evening, to 8 September 2015 afternoon due to agitation over the passing of three bills. Police and protesters clashed in different areas of Churachandpur district as mobs went on a rampage attacking residences of Ministers, MLAs and MPs.

The government ordered the respective Deputy Commissioner (DC) to shut down mobile data service in Imphal West and Imphal East district from 17 December 2016 till further order. On 18 December 2016, Home department of Government of Manipur was ordered to shutdown all mobile data services and SMS in Manipur from 10:00 on 18 December 2016, to 10:00 on 30 December 2016.

The government ordered all forms of telecom services, except voice calls, to be suspended for five days in Manipur with effect from Thursday night (19 July 2018) to prevent anti-national and anti-social messages on social media. Raghumani Singh, Special Secretary (Home)Manipur, in an order issued in the name of the Governor said the prohibition is imposed under Rule II of the Temporary Suspension of Telecom Services (Public Emergency or Public Safety) Rules, 2017.

For second time in 2018 the government ordered to shut down mobile data services in Manipur for five days, with effect from 21 September 2018, the prohibition was imposed under Rule II of the Temporary Suspension of Telecom Services (Public Emergency or Public Safety) Rules, 2017. An order issued by Special Secretary (Home) Raghumani said the step was taken to prevent spread of rumors, "which might have serious repercussion for the law and order situation in the entire state of Manipur."

For the third time under the leadership of CM N. Biren Singh in 2019 the state government ordered to shut down mobile data services in Manipur for five days, amidst protests against the Citizenship (Amendment) Bill which took effect from 11 February 2019 at midnight. District Magistrate for Imphal West Naorem Praveen Singh also barred cable news channels from “transmission of agitation or protest” indefinitely “until further orders”, under Section 19 of the Cable Television Networks (Regulation) Act, 1995 which prohibits transmission of agitation or protests which may lead to violence.

Internet and mobile data services were restored after an order in the name of the Governor issued by Raghumani Singh, Special Secretary (Home)Manipur, at 14:00 on 13 February 2019. The CAB was not tabled on Rajya Sabha as the law and order situation improved and come back to normalcy. 

On 16 March 2020, the Government of Manipur issued an ordered signed by H. Gyan Prakash, in the name of Governor of Manipur to suspend Internet services for 3 days in view to avoid the usage of social media networks which might lead to escalation of an incident between two communities at Chasad village of Kamjong district. Internet services were restored the next day reducing the period of suspension to one day.

On 06 Aug 2022, the Government of Manipur issued an ordered signed by H. Gyan Prakash, in the name of Governor of Manipur to suspend Internet Mobile services for 5 days in view to avoid the usage of social media networks which might lead to escalation of tense situation and volatile law order situation in the State of Manipur. On 09 Aug 2022 the Government of Manipur  issued an ordered signed by H. Gyan Prakash in view of the positive development, the suspension was relaxed.

Andhra Pradesh 
The State Government of Andhra Pradesh shut down the internet in Amalapuram, Andhra Pradesh on 25 May 2022 due to violent protests regarding the name change of Konaseema district where Amalapuram is located.

See also
Censorship in India
Information Technology Act, 2000
Fundamental Rights, Directive Principles and Fundamental Duties of India

References

Internet censorship in India
Mobile applications